Holo ACP synthase may refer to:
 Malonate decarboxylase holo-(acyl-carrier protein) synthase, an enzyme
 Holo-ACP synthase, an enzyme